Reckless Age is a 1944 American comedy film directed by Felix E. Feist and written by Gertrude Purcell and Henry Blankfort. The film stars Gloria Jean, Henry Stephenson, Kathleen Howard, Franklin Pangborn, Andrew Tombes, Marshall Thompson, Jane Darwell, Lloyd Corrigan, Judy Clark and Jack Gilford. The film was released on November 17, 1944, by Universal Pictures.

Plot

Cast        
Gloria Jean as Linda Wadsworth
Henry Stephenson as J. H. Wadsworth
Kathleen Howard as Sarah Wadsworth
Franklin Pangborn as Mr. Thurtle
Andrew Tombes as Mr. Cook
Marshall Thompson as Roy Connors
Jane Darwell as Mrs. Connors
Lloyd Corrigan as Mr. Connors
Judy Clark as Sandra Sibelius
Jack Gilford as Joey Bagle
Chester Clute as Jerkins
The Delta Rhythm Boys as Themselves
Harold Nicholas as Dancer

References

External links
 

1944 films
American comedy films
1944 comedy films
Universal Pictures films
Films directed by Felix E. Feist
American black-and-white films
1940s English-language films
1940s American films